Patriarch Nicephorus I may refer to:

 Nikephoros I of Constantinople, Ecumenical Patriarch in 806–815
 Patriarch Nicephorus of Alexandria, Greek Patriarch of Alexandria in 1639–1645